Tuctu (possibly from Quechua for "broody hen") is a mountain in the Cordillera Blanca in the Andes of Peru, about  high. It is situated in the Ancash Region, Huaraz Province, Olleros District, and in the Huari Province, Chavin de Huantar District. It lies southeast of Arhuay, Uruashraju and Tuctopunta.

References

Mountains of Peru
Mountains of Ancash Region